Vincent "Sonny" Dalesandro (born October 24, 1977 in Hayward, Wisconsin) is a retired professional soccer player and current restaurateur. He resides in Tulsa, Oklahoma. He is also co-owner of the Tulsa Athletics of the National Premier Soccer League.

Professional career
Dalesandro dropped out of Cascia Hall Preparatory School following his junior year to pursue a career as a professional soccer player. He had been named to the All-Conference team in all three years at Cascia.  At 17 he joined the USISL's Tulsa Roughnecks. He had an excellent debut season and was named 1995 USISL "Rookie of the Year".

In the fall of 1996, present day Tulsa Athletics coach Joey Ryan secured Daleasndro a tryout with the Milwaukee Wave. Sonny impressed enough to be taken on as the club's 3rd choice goalkeeper, later becoming the back-up to indoor soccer legend Victor Nogueira. He regards his tutelage under Nogueira as the most valuable instruction he received in his time as a professional. Dalesandro saw limited time in Milwaukee and was released during training camp the following season due to a broken thumb and the acquisition of former Canadian Olympic team goalkeeper Carmine Isacco.

Dalesandro returned to Tulsa and to playing for the Roughnecks in 1999. During the '99 season he was asked to play forward on 5 occasions where the team traveled a light roster. Scoring on three separate occasions against the Houston Hurricanes has earned him the peculiar title of top scoring American on the list of goalscoring goalkeepers.

Following the 1999 Outdoor season, friend and former coach Victor Moreland sent Dalesandro to his former club the Wichita Wings for a trial. Dalesandro impressed during the preseason tournament in Cleveland and was subsequently signed to a two-year contract. He was victorious and named "man of the match" in his first NPSL start against the Kansas City Attack at Kemper Arena October 23, 1999. A respectable 8-8 record subsequently placed Dalesandro 11th in the NPSL "Rookie of the year" voting. The following season Dalesandro was one of 6 players the Wings protected in the expansion draft. However, when the Edmonton Drillers folded in the beginning of the 2000-2001 season, the acquisition of 3-time All-Star goalkeeper Jim Larkin in the dispersal draft ultimately led to Dalesandro's release. During his time in Wichita, Dalesandro became an ordained minister through Universal Life Church (though he is an atheist) and would bless players shoes with water in the shape of a plus sign said to represent "positive energy".

In 2008 the Tulsa Revolution coaxed Dalesandro out of retirement to captain the upstart AISL franchise. Three games into the season, Dalesandro suffered a broken foot which required surgery. It was quickly revealed that the insurance that was in the players contracts was in fact, non-existent. Dalesandro took the ownership to court and upon their failure to appear, was awarded a default judgment. The ownership filed bankruptcy before any compensation was paid.

Dalesandro still plays Sunday league for Boston Avenue Athletic Club. A club he co-founded in 2005.

Restaurant
Sonny's father Vincent "Buzz" Dalesandro III founded the family's award-winning restaurant "Dalesandro's" in 1990, where it stayed until 2002 when Bank of America bought the property, tore it down, and built a parking lot. In 2004 the pair re-opened the business at its current 18th & Boston, Tulsa location. Sonny bought out his father's interest in January 2010. The restaurant has won "Best Italian" in Oklahoma Magazine, Tulsa People Magazine, and Urban Tulsa multiple times. The restaurant has also been featured in Southern Living Magazine

Tulsa Athletics
In August 2012, Dalesandro and longtime friend Dr. Tommy Kern purchased the rights to an NPSL club. On April 4, 2013 the Tulsa Athletics were unveiled to the public. The Athletics popularity was instant and after the first year were the 28th best attended soccer franchise in the United States. They were again in the top 35 for attendance in 2014. The team has experienced great on-field success as well, winning their division three times in the five years of their existence and thrice qualifying for the Lamar Hunt U.S. Open Cup. Dalesandro lightheartedly claims the role of club chairman, though he takes on any tasks necessary and can religiously be found mowing the game field in the early hours before every home game with a push mower. The team had regular talks with the NASL about moving to the now defunct US second division league. In 2017 the club changed their name to "Tulsa Athletic" following a petulant objection filed by the Oakland Athletics. The case is ongoing, but in February 2017 Dalesandro penned a humorous yet scathing article in The Tulsa Voice highlighting the ridiculousness of the claim.

Charity Work
Dalesandro works with countless charities through both Dalesandro's restaurant and the Tulsa Athletics. Some of these include breast cancer charities Oklahoma Project Woman and BCAP, HOPE (AIDS testing clinic) and Oklahomans for Equality (LGBT equal rights) to name a few.

Jiu Jitsu
In December 2015 & 2017, Dalesandro competed in American Grappling Federation's Nationals, both times winning gold in the no gi competition in his respective divisions. As a student under Todd Ryan of Brazilian Jiu Jitsu, he presently holds a purple belt.

Personal life
He can oftentimes be found roaming around Tulsa on his fixed gear bicycle or driving his gold 1970 Cadillac Coupe de Ville with his rescue chihuahua "Queenie". He is widely considered to be an old school punk and is generally a fan of anything counter culture. Dalesandro was married to English model/actress/dancer Stephanie Hepkin [née] Harrow. The two were married in 2003 and divorced in October 2006. He is also a member of the debauched sextet TEA.

Awards
USISL Rookie of the year – 1995
NPSL South-Central Conference Champion – 2013, 2014, 2016
NPSL South Region Runner-up – 2014
Oklahoma Magazine "Best Italian" – 2008, 2009, 2010, 2013, 2014, 2015, 2016, 2017
Tulsa People Magazine "Best Italian" – 2009, 2013, 2014, 2015, 2016
Urban Tulsa Magazine "Best Italian" – 2009, 2011, 2012, 2013, 2014
Tulsa Voice Magazine "Best Italian" - 2015
AGF Nationals Gold medalist;- 2015, 2017

References

External links
 Dalesandro's restaurant official website
 Tulsa Athletics official website

1977 births
Living people
Sportspeople from Tulsa, Oklahoma
People from Hayward, Wisconsin
Soccer players from Wisconsin
Businesspeople from Tulsa, Oklahoma
Tulsa Roughnecks (1993–2000) players
Milwaukee Wave players
Wichita Wings (MISL) players
Tulsa Revolution players
Association football goalkeepers
American soccer players